The secretary of state of Indiana is one of five constitutional officers originally designated in Indiana's state constitution of 1816. Since 1851, it has been an elected position. The secretary of state oversees four divisions, and is the third highest constitutional office of the state government. The secretary serves as the state's chief election officer, enforces state securities regulations, regulates automobile dealerships in Indiana, and manages the state business services division. The current office holder is Diego Morales.

Qualifications and term limits

The Indiana secretary of state is a constitutional office first established in the 1816 Constitution of Indiana. Between 1816 and until 1851, the secretary of state was nominated by the governor and confirmed by the state senate. With the adoption of the current constitution in 1851 the secretary of state's office was filled by a public statewide election every four years.

To be eligible to serve as Secretary of State, a candidate must be a registered voter who is at least 30 years old on the day they take the oath of office. Secretaries of State take office on December 1 following their election and hold office for four years. Should they resign, be impeached, or die in office the governor has the power to appoint a temporary Secretary of State to serve until the next general election. The new Secretary of State, either appointed or elected, may only complete the term of the previous Secretary of State, not serve a new four-year term. A Secretary of State may be reelected any number of times, but may serve no more than eight years in any 12-year period. As of 2014, the salary for the secretary is $74,580 annually.

Secretary of State elections determine party status in Indiana. A party's Secretary of State candidate must garner at least 10 percent of the vote for his or her party to be considered a major party in the state.

Powers
The Indiana Secretary of State is a constitutional office in the executive branch of the Government of Indiana. State law designates the Indiana Secretary of State as the state’s chief election officer. The Indiana Election Division assists the Secretary in receiving candidate filings and certifying election results. The Indiana Election Division also receives campaign finance reports and assists the Indiana Election Commission in the administration of campaign finance laws. The Secretary of State serves as chair of the State Recount Commission which conducts recounts and contests regarding major party primary nominations and general elections for federal, statewide, and state legislative offices.

The Indiana General Assembly has granted the secretary additional statutory powers to maintain the state's registry of notaries.

The Indiana Securities Division is placed under the leadership of the secretary. The division is statutory and is responsible for enforcing regulations on the purchase, sale, and trade of all security investments in the state. The division is responsible for granting operating licenses to collection agencies who wish to collect debts within the state. The division investigates violations of the state securities laws, can levy fines on law violators, and can request the Indiana Attorney General pursue criminal charges. As of 2007, the division regulated over 1,000 trading firms and their nearly 40,000 agents.

The secretary also heads the statutory Division of Business Services. The division is responsible for maintaining the records of all corporations operating within Indiana, which in 2007 amounted to over 250,000 active and inactive corporations. Non-profit businesses, limited liability companies, and limited liability partnerships also are required to register with the division. The division also approves trademarks and service marks for state companies. The division also maintains Indiana's Uniform Commercial Code which documents the assets and finances of businesses that fall under jurisdiction of the code. In 2007, approximately one million records were kept in accordance with the code.

Duties
The Office of Secretary of State is one of five constitutional officers originally designated in Indiana's State Constitution of 1816. Sixty-one Hoosiers have served as the third highest-ranking official in state government.

Early duties of the office included the maintenance of state records and preservation of the state seal. But as state government expanded, so did the responsibilities of the Secretary of State. Present responsibilities include chartering of new business, regulation of the securities industry, administering regulations relating to the registration of motorized vehicle dealers, and oversight of state elections.

Organization of office

The Executive Office, located in the Indiana Statehouse, oversees the overall policy, management, and budgeting for the entire office. Four main divisions comprise the balance of the office: Elections, Business Services, Securities and Dealer Services.

Elections - The Elections Division assists the Secretary of State in carrying out the responsibilities assigned as Indiana's chief elections officer. The bipartisan division is composed of an equal number of Democrats and Republicans. The division's administrative responsibilities include overseeing the candidate declaration process, certifying election results, and maintaining campaign finance reports. The Secretary of State also serves as chairperson for the Indiana Recount Commission and participates in voter outreach projects aimed at increasing voter participation. The Indiana Election Commission, as opposed to the Division, is an independently appointed Commission of two Republicans and two Democrats. The commission deals with questions associated with violations of the Indiana election laws, and with the imposition of penalties.

Business Services - The Business Services Division administers all business-related responsibilities for the Secretary of State including the chartering of new businesses, the filing of commercial liens, and the issuance of trademarks, notaries public and summonses.

Securities - The Securities Division oversees Indiana's securities industry. The division is charged with protecting Hoosier investors by bringing enforcement actions against companies and individuals selling securities in violation of Indiana's securities laws and by educating Hoosiers about prudent investing. Over the past four years, the division has imposed a record amount in fines and penalties against scam artists preying upon unsuspecting Hoosier investors.

Dealer Services - Dealer Services administers regulations relating to the registration of motorized vehicle dealers, including dealers for automobiles, watercraft, off-road vehicles and automobile salvage.

List of secretaries of state

Territorial secretaries

Secretaries of state

See also

Government of Indiana
 List of company registers

Notes

References

Bibliography

External links
Official homepage of the Indiana Secretary of State

 
1816 establishments in Indiana